The Louis Vuitton Acts were a series of International America's Cup Class regattas leading up to the 2007 Louis Vuitton Cup and 2007 America's Cup. Thirteen regattas or acts were held in total. These regattas involved all eleven challengers plus the holder of the America's Cup, Alinghi, and allowed the challengers to earn bonus points that went towards the Louis Vuitton Cup. The 2004-2007 period was the first time this format had been used in America's Cup racing.

2004 ACC Championship
The 2004 ACC Championship was won by Team New Zealand.

* The two teams that DNC in Act 1 received 7 points.

Act 1
Act One was sailed in Marseille, France. The Act was scheduled to consist of six fleet races and a round robin of match races, however two fleet races were canceled due to poor weather. BMW Oracle Racing won Act 1.
Act 1 saw the debut of FRA 57 and RSA 48, the rebadged NZL 57 and ITA 48 from the 2000 America's Cup.

Act 2
Act Two was sailed in Valencia, Spain. This was the first regatta in the port that was to host the 2007 Louis Vuitton Cup and America's Cup. Three rounds of racing were lost to poor weather. The Act consisted of a double round robin of match races. Emirates Team New Zealand won Act 2.
Act 2 saw the debut of FRA 60 and ITA 59, a rebadged NZL 60 and SUI 59 from the 2000 America's Cup and 2000 Louis Vuitton Cup respectively.
Team New Zealand used NZL 81 after NZL 82 was damaged in a storm after the Marseille leg, BMW Oracle Racing used USA 71 for the same reason.

Act 3
Act Three was sailed in Valencia, Spain. The Act was scheduled to consist of seven fleet races, however one fleet race was canceled due to poor weather. Alinghi won Act 3.

2005 ACC Championship
The 2005 ACC Championship was won by Alinghi.

Act 4
Act Four was sailed in Valencia, Spain. The Act consisted of a singleround robin of match races. Alinghi won Act 4.
Act 4 saw the debut of RSA 83, the first IACC boat constructed in Africa, and SUI 75.
Desafío Español 2007 sailed ESP 67, a rebadged USA 67 from OneWorld's 2003 Louis Vuitton Cup campaign while Mascalzone Latino - Capitalia Team sailed ITA 77, a rebadged USA 77 from Team Dennis Conner's 2003 campaign.
Team Germany sailed GER 72, which was a rebadged ITA 72 from Mascalzone Latino, while China Team sailed CHN 69 as they had merged with Le Defi and acquired FRA 69.

Act 5
Act Five was sailed in Valencia, Spain. The Act consisted of five fleet races. Luna Rossa won Act 5.

Act 6
Act Six was held in Malmö, Skåne, Sweden. The Act consisted of a single round robin of match races. Alinghi won Act 6.
Victory Challenge switched from SWE 63 to SWE 73, deciding it was better suited to the Swedish conditions

Act 7
Act Seven was held in Malmö, Skåne, Sweden. The Act was to consist of five fleet races, however poor weather meant that the Act was reduced to three races. Alinghi won Act 7.

Act 8
Act Eight was held in Trapani, Italy. The Act consisted of a single round robin of match races. Alinghi won Act 8.

Act 9
Act Nine was held in Trapani, Italy. The Act consisted of five fleet races. Alinghi won Act 9.

2006 ACC Championship
The 2006 ACC Championship was won by Team New Zealand.

Act 10
Act Ten was sailed in Valencia, Spain. The Act consisted of a singleround robin of match races. BMW Oracle Racing won Act 10.
Act 10 saw the debut of USA 87, ITA 86 and NZL 84.
Act 10 saw the introduction of CHN 79, a rebadged FRA 79 from Le Defi's 2003 Louis Vuitton Cup campaign, and ESP 65, formerly USA 65 from OneWorld's 2003 campaign.

Act 11
Act Eleven was held in Valencia, Spain. The Act consisted of five fleet races. Alinghi won Act 11.

Act 12
Act Twelve was sailed in Valencia, Spain. The Act consisted of a singleround robin of match races plus three divisions of knock out finals. Emirates Team New Zealand won Act 12.
Act 12 saw the introduction of ESP 88.

Division 1

Division 2

Division 3

2007 season
No ACC Championship was awarded in 2007, instead the focus was on the 2007 Louis Vuitton Cup and the 2007 America's Cup.

Act 13
Act Thirteen was held in Valencia, Spain. The Act consisted of seven fleet races. Alinghi won Act 13.
Act 13 was originally to be titled Act 14 due to the desire to avoid having a "thirteenth race" however the Act was later retitled Act 13 for simplicities sake.
Act 13 saw the introduction of SUI 91, ITA 94, FRA 93, ITA 85, ESP 97, ITA 99, GER 89, CHN 95 and SWE 96.

*+39 Challenge awarded redress after collision.

Bonus Points

Each challenger was awarded between 1-4 bonus points to take into the 2007 Louis Vuitton Cup based on their performances in the last Ten Acts. Between 11-1 points were awarded to each team per Act based on the final position the syndicate when Alinghi was excluded. For 2006 Acts the points were doubled and the points were tripled for 2007 Acts. The 2004 Acts were not worth any points. Emirates Team New Zealand topped the table and took the maximum four bonus points into the Louis Vuitton Cup.

*+39 Challenge awarded redress after collision in Act 13.

References

External links
Official Website of the 32nd America's Cup

Louis Vuitton regattas
L
L
L
L
Sports competitions in Valencia
Sport in Marseille
Sport in Malmö
Sport in Sicily
2004 in French sport
2004 in Spanish sport
2005 in Spanish sport
2005 in Italian sport
2005 in Swedish sport
2006 in Spanish sport
2007 in Spanish sport
2007 America's Cup
Sailing series